Heidi Dalton (born 21 March 1995) is a South African racing cyclist, who currently rides for South African amateur team, Demacon Ladies Cycling Team. She rode at the 2014 UCI Road World Championships. In 2017, she won the South African National Road Race Championships.

Major results

2013
 African Junior Road Championships
1st  Time trial
1st  Team time trial
4th Road race
 National Junior Road Championships
1st  Road race
1st  Time trial
2014
 National Road Championships
2nd Time trial
3rd Road race
2015
 African Road Championships
1st  Team time trial
2nd  Time trial
8th Road race
 African Games
2nd  Team time trial
7th Time trial
 3rd Time trial, National Road Championships
 KZN Autumn Series
4th Hibiscus Cycle Classic
8th PMB Road Classic
2017
 National Road Championships
1st  Road race
4th Time trial

References

External links

1995 births
Living people
South African female cyclists
Sportspeople from KwaZulu-Natal
African Games silver medalists for South Africa
African Games medalists in cycling
Competitors at the 2015 African Games
White South African people
21st-century South African women